Bayshore station is a Caltrain commuter rail station in the Visitacion Valley neighborhood of San Francisco, California. The station is on the border of San Francisco and the neighboring city of Brisbane. The parking lot and the northern section of the station are in San Francisco, while the remainder is in Brisbane. The station address is in San Francisco proper.

Bayshore has four tracks: two side tracks for trains stopping at the station, and two in the middle for trains that do not stop at the station. A centerline fence prevents passengers from crossing the four tracks.

History 
Bayshore was established by the Southern Pacific Railroad in 1907 along the new Bayshore Cutoff, a more direct route into San Francisco. The railroad planned to build an extensive terminal facility in Visitacion Valley that would serve as the primary maintenance and marshaling facility for the San Francisco Peninsula. Financial problems delayed completion of the project, and the  Bayshore rail yard and shops did not open until 1918. The facility operated around the clock and employed over 1,000 workers.

The Bayshore shops maintained all the locomotives on the Southern Pacific's Coast Division which stretched south to Santa Barbara. By 1952, this was 133 steam engines, but by 1954, diesel-electric locomotives had become common enough that the Bayshore steam shops were closed. The roundhouse continued to service diesel locomotives, but the decline of industry and shipping in San Francisco and along the peninsula led to the closure of the yards in the early 1980s.

A $6.87 million reconstruction of the footbridge began in July 2022.

The station is planned to be modified to accommodate through-running California High-Speed Rail service.

Unbuilt connection to Muni 
The San Francisco Municipal Railway (Muni) intended to establish another light rail connection to the Bayshore station at Visitacion Valley in southern San Francisco with its new Third Street Light Rail Project. However, following the Caltrain Express, completed in 2004, the Bayshore station was rebuilt and moved south. , the existing Bayshore station straddles the border between the counties of San Mateo and San Francisco; the platform itself is in Brisbane while the main parking lot is in San Francisco.

The T Third Street extension opened in early 2007 without a connection to Caltrain. Although Sunnydale Station is geographically closer to the Bayshore station, there is no public pathway running east–west directly connecting those two stations.

The potential connection has also been plagued by cost and design issues. Two proposed development projects adjacent to the station, the Visitacion Valley Transit Oriented Development Project (on the former site of the Schlage factory) and the Brisbane Baylands development (on the former Bayshore Railyard and San Francisco Municipal Landfill), could hasten the planning and conversion of Bayshore Station into an Intermodal Transit Station with a connection to Muni. The San Francisco County Transportation Authority adopted the Bayshore Intermodal Station Access Study in 2012. A loop extension of T Third would be built largely on San Mateo County land connecting the Sunnydale Station to a new intermodal platform west of the Peninsula Corridor rail line on land planned for redevelopment as part of the Brisbane Baylands. According to the Bi-County Transportation Study (2013), the estimated cost of extending T Third is $58 million, with an additional $31 million required to reconfigure Bayshore station.

In addition, Geneva Avenue would be extended east from Bayshore Boulevard (where it presently dead-ends) over the rail line to Harney and would connect a proposed Muni bus rapid transit (BRT) line to Bayshore Station. In the Geneva-Harney BRT Feasibility Study final report, published in July 2015, all of the near-term alternatives for BRT alignment would use existing streets, connecting the new Geneva-Harney line with T Third at Arleta; the long-term alternatives studied would extend Geneva (with a grade separation and connection to Bayshore) by 2040, making a new intermodal station for bus, light rail, and heavy/commuter rail. According to the Bi-County Transportation Study (2013), the estimated cost of extending Geneva is $90 million, and an additional $210 million would be required to set up the Geneva-Harney BRT line.

References

External links 

Caltrain Bayshore station page

Caltrain stations in San Francisco
Railway stations in the United States opened in 1907
1907 establishments in California
Caltrain stations in San Mateo County, California
Former Southern Pacific Railroad stations in California